Give My Head Peace is a satirical television comedy series on BBC Northern Ireland that pokes fun at political parties, paramilitary groups and the sectarian divide in Northern Ireland. The programme is written by Tim McGarry, Damon Quinn and Michael McDowell, also known as "The Hole in the Wall Gang", who also perform as the characters. Episodes are recorded in front of a live studio audience at the BBC Blackstaff Studio A in Belfast.

Background
The concept originated on BBC Radio Ulster music programme Across The Line in the late 1980s, as a five-minute slot. The radio version used many of the characters and plot ideas used in the later TV series.

Pilot: Two Ceasefires and a Wedding
Its first television appearance was in a made-for-TV film called Two Ceasefires and a Wedding, shown on BBC Northern Ireland (31 August 1995), poking fun at the clichéd "love across the barricades" plot that features in many dramas about Northern Ireland. In this case the lovers were Emer, the daughter of a "prominent" Sinn Féin activist, and Billy, an RUC constable. Their wedding is opposed by their respective families, and ends in farce, although Billy and Emer were happily married.

In the Pilot episode, Ma & Da have a second son, Paul, who suffers anxiety from being wrongly imprisoned for one of Da's failed missions in England. He is best man at Billy & Emer's wedding. He does not appear in the main series.

Main series

A full series was then commissioned by BBC Northern Ireland. Some changes were made to the format prior to the series going ahead – with the character of Cal (Emer's brother) changing substantially, and the introduction of other recurring characters such as Big Mervyn and Red Hand Luke. A few years into the series, Nuala McKeever (Emer) left the series to pursue other interests, and a new love interest for Billy was introduced in the form of Emer's previously unseen sister, Dympna.

The series continued to run on BBC One NI until 2005, taking a hiatus as the Hole in the Wall Gang began work on a new series called Dry Your Eyes. Give My Head Peace usually screened in a prime-time Friday night slot, opting out from network BBC One. In mid-2004, a selection of episodes were shown across the UK on BBC Two in a late-night slot during weekends.

The 50th episode, entitled "Secondary Colours" aired on 27 December 2002.

Cancellation
The final Give My Head Peace episode was transmitted on BBC One Northern Ireland on 28 December 2007. This was supposed to be the last ever episode but during the final few seconds, a graphic stating "That's All Folks?" appeared, suggesting that the show could return in the future. According to Tim McGarry, the reason for the show's cancellation was due to a mis-sent email, received by a BBC executive in charge of the show's production. Allegedly, McGarry had hit reply rather than forward to the intended recipient.

2016 special and soft reset
Give My Head Peace returned for a one-off 40-minute long episode titled "The Farce Awakens" on 28 December 2016 – exactly nine years to the day since it last aired. It was filmed in Northern Ireland in October 2016. Television presenter Christine Lampard made a cameo appearance.

With this special, they overwrite the events of the original final episode. In that episode, Billy kills Uncle Andy and Big Mervyn after learning they had lost Billy's house and money in a scam. While Billy is in custody, Cal's Protestant girlfriend Siobhan is revealed as an undercover police officer trying to get close to Da. When Siobhan tries to kill Da, Ma suspects them of having an affair. This, combined by the knowledge that Da had prevented Liam Neeson from proposing to their daughter Dympna, drives Ma to kill him. Dympna confesses to the murder to spare Ma from prison. Billy is released after being granted a pardon by Ian Paisley and Martin McGuiness. He learns of what happened to his wife Dympna and devotes himself to trying to clear her name, despite now living with two other women. The special now makes these events non-canon.

2018 return
The series returned with an eleventh series which began broadcasting on 19 January 2018. This was followed by a Christmas Special called "Shallow Grave" which aired on Thursday 27 December 2018 on BBC One Northern Ireland. The show returned for a Christmas Special in December 2019, as part of the 12th series consisting of four episodes leading into 2020.

The show is due to return in December 2020 for a Christmas Special followed by three other specials in early 2021. Recording of the 2020 Christmas Special and 2021 episodes had to be conducted under strict health guidance due to the Covid-19 pandemic with production moved from their usual location at BBC Blackstaff Studio in the centre of Belfast to a new studio located elsewhere in Northern Ireland to ensure social distancing could be maintained. No studio audience was present for the filming of the episodes, but a virtual audience watched and reacted to the recordings online. The 2020 Christmas special aired on Sunday 27 December 2020 on BBC One Northern Ireland, and saw the cast give a proper send off to the character "Big Mervyn", as the actor who played him BJ Hogg died earlier in 2020. Three other episodes will air from mid January 2021.

Live
In recent years, they have performed live shows at a selection of venues across Northern Ireland. The 2004 show was chiefly made up of scripts from the 2004–2005 series. In 2007 a new live show entitled Dry Your Eyes it's Give My Head Peace was held in Derry's Millennium Forum and the Grand Opera House to celebrate ten years of the show. This production showed material from GMHP and Dry Your Eyes and was very well received. The next live show in 2008 followed on from the final television episode, called Give My Head Peace: Back From The Grave, and also featured the Dry Your Eyes characters. In 2009, the gang went on their last tour called "Give My Head Peace: The Final Farewell Tour". However, the show returned on an annual basis with "Give My Head Peace: The Annual Review" touring Northern Ireland. The performance features the show's regulars, with the notable exceptions of Mervyn and Red Hand Luke, and also features a stand-up set from Tim McGarry who plays Da.

In 1999 a video and book were released. The only DVD released to date is of series 6, in November 2009.

Characters
The principal characters are:

Da (Tim McGarry) – Da is an Irish Catholic who represents a stereotypical Irish nationalist. He is an ardent fan of Irish culture despite having little knowledge of Irish history and being unable to speak a word of Irish. Da is a Sinn Féin spokesman who later becomes an assemblyman, and recently a "retired assemblyman". He is very proud of his involvement and (exaggerated) friendship with Gerry Adams. He is fired repeatedly for embarrassing Gerry or the party publicly. He often gets reinstated after blackmailing Gerry with incriminating evidence, which inevitably gets destroyed through ineptitude. He has a beard and wears glasses to replicate Gerry's appearance, save for three episodes where they had fallen out. Da claims to have been involved with every unlawful activity that Gerry was allegedly involved with. In the original run, he claims he was directly involved with the IRA alongside Gerry, but has since admitted that he wasn't as involved as Gerry was. Da lives in Divis Tower on the Falls Road. He has six adult children with Ma, but only four have ever been seen. It was recently discovered that he was not legally married to Ma, but he is tricked into marrying her again by Cal.
Cal (Damon Quinn) – Although he is a grown man, he still lives at home and often acts child-like. He supports his father in his self-proclaimed struggle against British imperialism, and usually does what Da tells him, no matter how daft. In the pilot "Two Ceasefires and a Wedding", he is portrayed as a more sinister IRA activist. In the main series, he is much more gentle and slightly dim-witted. He often proves to be naturally talented at most things he tries, but his attempts at being successful are usually scuppered quite quickly. He is jealous of his seldom seen brother Michael. It is stated by Ma on multiple occasions that Cal came "really close" to getting married until Da ruined, but the details keep changing. In later episodes, he becomes increasingly suspicious that Da is siding with the British, and stands up to him when he is mean to Ma.
Uncle Andy (Martin Reid) – Uncle Andy is an old-fashioned traditional loyalist whose twin loves are British Ulster and Elvis Presley. He is very argumentative, and determined to take offense at even the slightest suggestion that someone is trying to oppress him. He blames all problems on Catholics and Sinn Fein, and is often abusive towards Dympna for simply being a Catholic and a woman. He often devises elaborate money-making schemes and scams with his best friend Big Mervyn. Their combined lack of intelligence and foresight often cause these plans to fail. In similar respect, he is repeatedly barred from the Loyalist Kneebreakers Social Club or the Orange Order due to his tricks or inappropriate conduct. He used to try to avoid eviction by claiming he was really Billy's father until he himself lost track over whether or not it was a scam. It was eventually confirmed that he isn't. He is "close friends" with Red Hand Luke and Pastor Begbie despite clearly living in fear of them. In most recent episodes, he becomes convinced that Grainne is his daughter from a one night stand with her mother, mainly because Billy said it was confirmed by a DNA test. The truth has yet to be verified.
Billy (Michael McDowell) – Uncle Andy's nephew and a police officer with the PSNI (formerly RUC). He immediately married Emer after first meeting her in the pilot episode. By the beginning of the first series, it had become a loveless marriage. After Emer leaves with their son, Billy instantly falls in love with Dympna who moves in with him. They are married by the Pope after his divorce is finalised. Billy was raised by Uncle Andy after being abandoned by both parents. There are recurring hints that Uncle Andy is his father until it is eventually verified as untrue. He often as sumomes "politics" (i.e. he isn't a Catholic) is keeping him from promotions, when in fact he is quite lazy. He eventually gets his promotion for helping investigate the hit-and-run incident that injured Da, even though he committed it. While he openly objects to the criminal acts of Uncle Andy and his associates, Billy isn't above abusing his policing powers for his own advantage.
Emer (Nuala McKeever) – Emer is Da and Ma's daughter, and marries Billy in the pilot episode. Like Ma, she is uninterested in politics and mean towards Da. However, she is quite intelligent and well informed. She is more interested in fashion and men. So much so that she shamelessly pursues other men despite Billy's protests. It is often said that she has a son with Billy who is never seen. By the beginning of series 2, she has left Billy for a Spaniard, and taken their son with them. They are seldom mentioned again until it is discovered that she remarried, thus making it easier for Billy to have his divorce. He shares a birthday with Cal.
Ma (Olivia Nash) – Da's cynical and sharp-tongued wife. She tries to be a typical warm-hearted Irish mother, but she quickly gets frustrated with her family. She openly resents Da, who makes fun of her short stature, and she refers to as a "lanky streak of piss". While she keeps wishing ill of her husband, she is hurt any time he takes interest in other women. She is uninterested in politics and finds sectarianism to be dumb. This allows her to be accepting of things and people that Da and Cal are less open to, particularly her protestant in-laws. She has the occasional mild crush on Uncle Andy. Multiple episodes revealed that she has obsessions with various celebrities, but the identity of that person keeps changing (e.g. they have included Daniel O'Donnell and Hugo Duncan. She recently learned that she wasn't legally married to Da, but they did marry after Cal tricked Da into it. She also revealed that she is actually a British citizen by birth, and has only ever had British identification documents, which aggravates Da no end.
Dympna (Alexandra Ford) – Dympna is one of Ma and Da's daughters, and Emer's younger sister. She replaced Emer as Billy's partner after Emer suddenly leaves. She is just as intelligent as her sister, but becomes increasingly ignorant of politics after becoming a Sinn Fein assemblyperson. An important difference is that Dympna is faithful to Billy, and rejects advances from other men. She is bullied by Uncle Andy for being a Catholic and a woman, but she can also dish it back. Dympna marries Billy in a service conducted by The Pope. It is hinted that she is the biological daughter of Italian Cardinal Vincenzo, but this is never resolved. She has a recurring ambition to become famous despite having no talents.
Big Mervyn (BJ Hogg) – A burly, leather-wearing loyalist, and Uncle Andy's actual best mate. Not the brightest, but generally well-liked. He often assists Uncle Andy in his schemes with little objection. He is also often the bearer of bad news for Uncle Andy, including passing on the news that he has been banned from the Loyalist Kneebreakers Social Club, or the Orange Order. It is often shown that Big Mervyn had multiple talents and is largely popular, but his association with Uncle Andy prevented him from prospering. He is often asked to recall memories of Uncle Andy's life on his behalf and does so perfectly. It is occasionally explained that Big Mervyn chooses to remain single due to not having gotten over a past love gone sour.  However, the woman and events in question change every time the story is told.  In the most recent series, it is acknowledged that Big Mervyn has passed away (coinciding with Hogg's own death). It is also mentioned that he is a keen animal lover even though he is never seen near one.
Pastor Begbie (Paddy Jenkins) – Pastor Begbie appeared as a recurring character late into the original run, but has since become a main character. Like Red Hand Luke, he is a born-again Christian and a feared loyalist who has been friends with Uncle Andy since childhood, even though Uncle Andy is clearly terrified of them. Despite being a Presbyterian minister and the leader of the local UDA, he continues to be involved with organised crime and makes no secret of it. He is also an ordained priest and a member of the IRA, both of which he joined by accident while drunk. He detests all police officers and Catholics. He often forces Uncle Andy and Big Mervyn into doing painful or embarrassing tasks for him, threatening him with harm if they refuse. He was born on the same day as Uncle Andy, and expected to die on his 50th birthday due to a family curse. However, he survives and learns that he is not actually biologically related to his father. In the most recent series, he reveals that he has an identical twin brother who is a Catholic priest in Poland. He thought he was keeping his Polish heritage a secret, but his brother revealed he was born in Northern Ireland.
 Grainne (Diona Doherty) – A new addition, Grainne McCallion is Dympna's assistant. She is rude and immature, and dismisses everyone around her as being boring or stupid. She is completely ignorant of Northern Irish history and politics despite working for Sinn Fein with her mother Elisha McCallion. She enrolled as a student at Queen's despite being on furlough from her present job. Uncle Andy is convinced that she is his daughter from a one night stand with her mother, but she is unaware of this. She is initially terrified by Uncle Andy's attempts to bond with her, but they develop a reluctant friendship. Even though she acts dumb, she often demonstrates that she is highly intelligent and well connected. One example is when she figures out how Uncle Andy can save the Loyalist Kneebreakers Social Club from being demolished after first learning about the situation hours before it was due to happen. Even though all of her classes have been online (due to government responses to the COVID-19 pandemic), she has become a major influencer among Catholic students. Being from Derry, she is the only main character not to be from the greater Belfast area.
Sandy (Ciaran Nolan) – Sandy is the current landlord at the Loyalist Kneebreakers Social Club. While he has been mentioned in past episodes, he made his first onscreen appearances in the most series. He likes Big Mervyn and trusts Pastor Begbie almost unconditionally. He is more weary of Uncle Andy due to his various scams and often has to tell Big Mervyn to inform him he is barred. In spite of that, he reveals that he considers Uncle Andy to be one of his closest friends and vows revenge when he believes Uncle Andy has been kidnapped. He also attacks Pastor Begbie when Billy wrongly alleges he killed Uncle Andy, making Sandy one of only two people brave enough to stand up to him.

Other occasional characters are:

Red Hand Luke (Dan Gordon) – A born-again Christian and violent loyalist psychopath. In the first series, he is released from prison and seeks out Uncle Andy, who believes Red Hand Luke wants to kill him for not helping him escape the police. Instead, Red Hand Luke tells Uncle Andy about his conversion and thanks Uncle Andy for allowing him to be arrested. In spite of his violent tendencies, he is quite child-like, and a huge "Shugo" Duncan fan. He tends to beat people up, usually Uncle Andy and Big Mervyn, when he doesn't get his way. The duo live in fear of each time he (literally) bursts through the front door. However, he does have brief moments of clarity where he realises that his actions may be the reason why he suffers negative consequences. He is best friends with Pastor Begbie and the only character that doesn't fear him. At the end of the original run, he converts to Islam in order to get arrested so he can be sent back to prison, where he longs to return. Uncle Andy and Big Mervyn attempt to break him out of the specially constructed prison in the middle of Belfast Lough. He falls into the Lough, protesting that he cannot swim. His fate is left ambiguous, but he is never mentioned again. 
Sammy (Gordon Fulton) – The first landlord of the "Loyalist Kneebreakers", Uncle Andy and Big Mervyn's favourite haunt, a rowdy loyalist drinking den. Makes matchstick models of Stormont in his spare time.
Seamus (Mark O'Shea) – Seamus works directly for Gerry Adams in Sinn Fein in constantly changing roles. He doesn't allow Da or Cal to tell anyone he is also in the IRA. Seamus invites himself into Da's flat with instructions from Gerry to help either organisation, hinting at serious repercussions for their (inevitable) failures. Da tries to earn Seamus' trust by proving his loyalty and is fully aware Seamus is involved with organised crime.
Sean Paul II (Gerard Jordan) – Sean Paul is a young man who will steal anything. Ma points out his nickname is "Sean Paul the Second" because he steals your possessions "the second your back is turned". Ma is horrified that Da keeps hiring him or buying stolen goods from him. Da justifies this by pretending he is supporting an "enterprising young man" when in reality he likes cheap products or labour.
Paul – Paul is one of Da and Ma's six children. He is sent to prison during the pilot episode. The parents often update Cal on Paul's present situation. Either Da praises Paul's "sacrifice" while he is in prison, or Ma praises Paul for starting a new life as a wealthy family man in Los Angeles. Cal is strongly jealous of Paul, especially when he randomly returns from L.A. Cal discovers that Paul was thrown out by his wife due to his refusal to find a job, and takes great joy in exposing the secret. However, as he comes clean, he receives a message from his wife that Paul has successfully sold a script that will be turned into a major Hollywood movie, which he has also been hired to direct, and that she is willing to take him back.

There have been other characters that have made one-off special appearances over the series to great effect. One such example was a Christmas special entitled "The King and I" where Elvis Presley (played by impersonator Martin Fox) saved Andy from a very dangerous situation.

Home media

VHS
A VHS was released containing the following three episodes; Hollywood on the Falls, Red Hand Luke, The Peace Dividend.

DVD
Only series six has been released on DVD to date. It was released in two parts, with three episodes on each, before being sold together as part of a box set. One notable edit is that the theme song has been replaced.

Digital
The 2016 special The Farce Awakens (21 October 2016) and the documentary A Beginner's Guide (28 December 2016) that was broadcast on BBC One are both available on BBC Store.

Trivia
The phrase "give my head peace" is a common idiom in Northern Ireland meaning "leave me alone" or "stop bothering me".
The theme song of the series is "She Says" performed by The Saw Doctors. It was released as a single in Ireland in the late 1990s.

References

External links
 
Give My Head Peace via The Internet Archive

1998 British television series debuts
1990s British satirical television series
2000s British satirical television series
2010s British satirical television series
2020s British satirical television series
BBC Northern Ireland television shows
English-language television shows
Irish comedy television shows
1990s television series from Northern Ireland
2000s television series from Northern Ireland
2010s television series from Northern Ireland
2020s television series from Northern Ireland